Visanthe O. Shiancoe (born June 18, 1980) is a British former American football tight end. After playing college football for Morgan State, he was drafted by the New York Giants in the third round of the 2003 NFL Draft. He played for the Giants for four seasons from 2003 to 2006 and the Minnesota Vikings for five seasons from 2007 to 2011. He played for the New England Patriots in 2012 and the Tennessee Titans in 2013.

Early life
Shiancoe was born in Birmingham, England to a Liberian mother and a Ghanaian father. As an infant, he emigrated to the United States with his mother, settling in Silver Spring, Maryland.

Shiancoe played high school football for Montgomery Blair High School in Silver Spring. He attended Morgan State University in Baltimore, Maryland where he transformed himself from a 190-pound freshman to a 250-pound senior tight end.

Professional career

2003 NFL Combine

New York Giants (2003–2006)
Shiancoe was drafted in the third round (91st overall) in the 2003 NFL Draft by the New York Giants. He played for the Giants for four seasons, mostly serving as a backup to Jeremy Shockey.

Minnesota Vikings (2007–2011)
Shiancoe signed a five-year, $18.2 million contract with the Minnesota Vikings as a free agent in 2007. He compiled 208 receptions for 2,424 yards and 24 touchdowns in his five seasons as a Viking, in regular season games. Shiancoe played in all 80 games over those five seasons, of which he started 66. He led NFC tight ends with seven touchdowns in 2008 and ranked third by a tight end in the NFL.

New England Patriots (2012)
Shiancoe agreed to a one-year deal with the New England Patriots on July 24, 2012, reportedly worth $1.2 million. He was activated on November 11, 2012 after an injury to Aaron Hernandez and a suspension of Brandon Bolden. On December 11, 2012, he was released.

Baltimore Ravens (2013)
On July 28, 2013, Shiancoe signed a one-year deal to play for the Baltimore Ravens. The contract was considered a "qualifying contract" under which Shiancoe stood to make the veteran minimum for a player with 10 or more years of service ($940,000) while counting as only $555,000 against the Ravens' salary cap. The signing was prompted by a season-ending hip injury suffered during training camp by Dennis Pitta. After less than a month on the team, Shiancoe was released after the third week of preseason on August 25, 2013.

Tennessee Titans
On December 3, 2013, Shiancoe signed with the Tennessee Titans. On December 10, the Titans released Shiancoe.

Television appearances
Shiancoe was a contestant on NBC's Minute to Win It on September 8, 2010, playing to win money for the National Kidney Foundation.  When he could not perform the card trick, where he had to blow off a deck of 53 playing cards with one joker at the bottom remaining on the bottle in a minute, he successfully performed the same trick on NFL Network again in less than 30 seconds, only to realize that the final Joker card was glued on.

Towel incident
Fox aired a post game segment following a victory over the Detroit Lions in 2008. Vikings owner Zygi Wilf was presenting the game ball to coach Brad Childress' son, Andrew, who had enlisted in the United States Marine Corps the day before. In the background, Shiancoe was shown unclothed for a moment before covering himself with a towel. According to the NFL and Fox Sports, the image lasted a fifth of a second.  Fox Sports apologized for airing the image. Through his agent, Shiancoe said he was embarrassed by the unintentional incident.

Personal life
Shiancoe currently resides in Prince George's County, Maryland. Although his first name has been commonly mispronounced as vi-SAWN-tee or vi-SAWN-tae he has clarified that the correct pronunciation is vi-SAWNTH.

He plans to become involved in causes in his mother's home country of Liberia.

References

External links
Official website

Minnesota Vikings bio

1980 births
Living people
Sportspeople from Birmingham, West Midlands
English emigrants to the United States
American football tight ends
American people of Ghanaian descent
American people of Liberian descent
Baltimore Ravens players
Black British sportspeople
English players of American football
English people of Ghanaian descent
English people of Liberian descent
Minnesota Vikings players
Morgan State Bears football players
New England Patriots players
New York Giants players
People from Silver Spring, Maryland
Tennessee Titans players